Surjit Bindrakhia (born Surjit Bains; 15 April 1962 – 17 November 2003) was a singer from Punjab, India. He was known for his unique voice and hekh, in which he sings a note continuously in one breath. His biggest hits include Meri Nath Dig Paye, Dupatta Tera Satrang Da, Lakk Tunoo Tunoo, Bas Kar Bas Kar, Mukhda Dekh Ke, Tera Yaar Bolda, and Jatt Di Pasand. Surjit is considered to have one of the greatest voices in Bhangra. He received a special jury award at the 2004 Filmfare Awards for his contribution to Punjabi music.

Early life and family
Bindrakhia was born as Surjit Bains to Sucha Singh and Gurcharan Kaur in the Bindrakh village of Rupnagar district, Punjab, India. His father was a famous village wrestler, who brought the village to prominence. Surjit was influenced by his father to take up wrestling and kabaddi. He won inter-college bouts at the university level. Although his father always wanted Surjit to be a wrestler, he always wanted to be a singer. He began his singing career by singing boliyan for his college bhangra team. He received formal training from his guru, Atul Sharma. Bindrakhia appeared in films before he was a major figure in the music industry. He was an extra in movies, appearing in the background of several scenes. His first appearance in the Punjabi movie industry was in the film Anakh Jattan Dee, where he has sung the title song, Baniye Ne Jatt. Lyricist Shamsher Sandhu recognised the talent Surjit had, which gifted him an opportunity into the Punjabi music industry. Most of his hit songs were written by Shamsher Sandhu and music was produced by Atul Sharma.

Surjit  Bindrakhia married Preet Kamal in April 1990. The couple had two children, son Gitaz Bindrakhia, and daughter Minaz Bindrakhia.

Professional life
Surjit Bindrakhia had arguably one of the most powerful voices among Bhangra singers during his time. Throaty, with a wide range of sounds, he was one of the most successful traditional artists doing the rounds of the bhangra scene during his time. Surjit had been known in Punjab for many years. His first break in the Punjabi music industry came in 1990 with the album Addi Utte Ghum, which included the track Jugni in which Bindrakhia performs his world record 32-second hekh. Surjit Bindrakhia is credited as being the first international superstar in bhangra music. His song Dupatta Tera Sat Rang Da holds the record for being the number one Punjabi song on UK charts for weeks.

Immensely popular in the 1980s, 1990s, and 2000s, Bindrakhia's voice was considered to be one of the most powerful voices among traditional singers like in Punjab. He had cut 32 solo audio cassettes during his decade-long career. Surjit's big break in the international market came in 1994 with Dupatta Tera Sat Rang Da, a track that can only be called game-changing. Since then many singers have tried to replicate this success, however, few have come close to Bindrakhia's height of success. Many remixes of his older songs had been created during the 1990s. This helped Bindrakhia to further blur the contrasts of modern Punjabi Bhangra and traditional folk. Bindrakhia was a traditional bhangra singer, and since most of his work had been produced in India, it may at first have appeared unpolished. Certainly, the music is more "rustic" than that found on many bhangra bands from the UK, but that did not reduce its impact. There are more sustained dhol beats in Bindrakhia's work than you would find elsewhere and the style is traditional.

A note must be made of the high tone hekh Bindrakhia used, which sounded high in pitch and could last up to 42 seconds. You can find others trying such vocal pyrotechnics, however, no one can pull it off similar to how Bindrakhia did. His singing style worked with the beat, so you would find him pausing along with the dhol and raising and shifting into different keys as the dhol does. All of this gave Bindrakhia the air of a child gone a little mad with his voice. Stated to be one of the most popular singers in Punjab, Surjit Bindrakhia was considered to be the vital link between traditional Punjabi folk music and modern Punjabi pop.

Death
It was reported by various news outlets that Surjit had been suffering from health issues throughout the later stages of his life, he had been hospitalised multiple times. Due to a sudden decline in health, Surjit Bindrakhia died from a cardiac arrest on the morning of 17 November 2003 at his home in Phase-7, Mohali.

Many singers and artists attended his bhog and funeral at Bindrakhia's native village Bindrakh. Some of the artists who turned up to pay their last respects to the legend included Sardool Sikander, Hans Raj Hans, Gurpreet Ghuggi, Babbu Maan, Gurdas Maan his lyricist and a close friend Shamsher Singh Sandhu, and his guru and music composer Atul Sharma.

Legacy
Bindrakhia stormed the market with over 250 million hit sales of which 175 million came from India alone. He later combined with greats such as Surinder Shinda doing live sets.

Punjabi singer Babbu Maan paid respects to Bindrakhia's family and in his 2005 album Pyaas, pays tribute with a song dedicated to Bindrakhia titled as Pind Diyan Juhaan. In 2011 DJ Harvey and Nirmal Sidhu made a tribute song to Surjit Bindrakhia called Bindrakhia Boliyan which has been a huge success since its release being ranked at Number 1 on the BBC Asian Network Chart in the first week of release.

In 2018 DJ and Music Producer DJ Frenzy released a remix track of the hit song Mundri Nishani. This is part of a series of Bindrakhia tracks that are to be remixed by the DJ. The first track itself has been a huge success and has widely received by fans.

Discography

Posthumous albums

Religious and special albums

Filmography

References

https://www.youtube.com/watch?v=GXnhqzCOHjA

Bhangra (music) musicians
1962 births
2003 deaths
Indian musicians
People from Rupnagar
20th-century Indian singers
Singers from Punjab, India
20th-century Indian male singers